Asemic may refer to:

 Asemia, a communication disorder
 Asemic writing
 Asemic is also an instrumental progressive metal band based in Bucharest, Romania.